Lucien Gaillard (1861 – 1942, both in Paris, France) was a French goldsmith and jeweller, who worked in the art nouveau style.

Lucien Gaillard was born into a family of jewellers.  His grandfather Amédée Alexandre Gaillard (1811-1882) founded a jewellery firm in Paris in 1840, which he then passed on to his son Ernest (1836-1909).  Lucien Gaillard trained as an apprentice under his father, before taking over the business in 1892.  His brother Eugéne was also a well known art nouveau furniture designer.

He was a contemporary of René Lalique.

He won a prize for his jewellery at the 1889 Universal Exposition.  He was also a judge at the 1893 Universal Exposition in Chicago.  In 1902 he was made a knight of the Legion of Honour.

He was deeply interested in Japanese art.  His workshop included artists who travelled from Japan to work in ivory and lacquer.  He also worked in copper.

His workshop produced vases, cane heads, hair combs, pins and pendants as well as more traditional jewellery, often inspired by floral or animal motifs.  The animal motifs included bees, butterflies, dragonflies and snakes.  He was known for using only a single motif per item.  Sometimes, when making insect wings, he used a technique called plique-à-jour, where enamel is not applied to a metal base, but rather set in a gossamer thin wire framework to produce the effect of insect wings.

Around 1910, the Gaillard workshop began to work in glass, including collaborations with several perfume houses, including Geldy and Corday.

The work of Gaillard and his workshop are on display in the Musée D'Orsay, the Metropolitan Museum and the V&A museum.

References 

1861 births
1942 deaths
French jewellery designers
French goldsmiths
Metalsmiths from Paris
Chevaliers of the Légion d'honneur